The Cheyenne Mountain School District 12 (D12) is a public school district in southwestern Colorado Springs, Colorado, United States.

List of schools
There are eight schools in the Cheyenne Mountain School District. In addition to these schools, the district provides educational services to the Zebulon Pike Youth Services Center.

See also
List of school districts in Colorado

References

External links

School districts in Colorado
Education in Colorado Springs, Colorado
School districts established in 1872
1872 establishments in Colorado Territory